ORG-37684 is a drug developed by Organon, which acts as a potent and selective agonist for the 5-HT2 receptor family, with highest affinity at 5-HT2C and lowest at 5-HT2B subtypes. It has anorectic effects in animal studies and has been researched as a potential weight loss drug for use in humans.

See also 
 ORG-12962
 Quipazine

References 

Serotonin receptor agonists
Indanes
Phenol ethers
Pyrrolidines